Oliver Anthony Turton (born 6 December 1992) is an English professional footballer who plays as a right back or central midfielder for Huddersfield Town. He has also played for Crewe Alexandra and Blackpool.

Early life
Turton was born in Manchester, Greater Manchester.

Career

Crewe Alexandra
Turton began his professional career with Crewe Alexandra in 2010. He joined Northern Premier League Division One South club Market Drayton Town on loan along with Jason Oswell. He made his debut, aged 18, for Crewe in a League Two match against Stockport County at Gresty Road on 30 April 2011, which ended in a 2–0 win for Crewe. He came on as a late substitute for Mat Mitchel-King.

He scored his first Crewe goal in a 1–1 draw at Oldham Athletic on 21 September 2013.

On 9 May 2017, Crewe announced that Turton had been offered a new contract, though manager David Artell gave a 22 May deadline for a decision otherwise the offer would be rescinded. On 23 May Turton reported for training but had not yet clarified his decision to Artell. After a further 24 hours reflection, Turton decided not to accept the club's contract offer and opted to become a free agent.

Blackpool
In June 2017, Turton signed a two-year contract with League One side Blackpool. He made his Blackpool debut in the club's season-opening fixture at Bradford City on 5 August 2017, and scored his first goal for the club in a 3-3 draw at Doncaster Rovers two weeks later.

Turton signed a new one-year contract with the club in July 2020.

Huddersfield Town
Turton turned down the offer of a new contract at Blackpool, instead opting to sign for Huddersfield Town on 3 June 2021.

Career statistics

Honours
Crewe Alexandra
Football League Trophy: 2012–13

References

External links

Profile at the Blackpool F.C. website

1992 births
Living people
Footballers from Manchester
English footballers
Association football defenders
Association football midfielders
Crewe Alexandra F.C. players
Market Drayton Town F.C. players
Blackpool F.C. players
Huddersfield Town A.F.C. players
Northern Premier League players
English Football League players